

Pagan (849–1297)

Small kingdoms

Myinsaing (1297–1313) and Pinya (1313–1364)

Sagaing (1315–1364)

Ava (1364–1555) and Prome (1482–1542)
 - Kings of Ava; 
 - Kings of Prome

Hanthawaddy (1287–1539, 1550–1552)

Mrauk-U (1429–1785)

Toungoo (1510–1752)

Konbaung (1752–1885)

Notes 

.
.
.
Burmese
History of Myanmar
.Tree